The Calgary Roughnecks are a lacrosse team based in Calgary, Alberta. The team plays in the National Lacrosse League (NLL). The 2020 season is the 19th in franchise history. Due to the COVID-19 pandemic, the season was suspended on March 12, 2020. On April 8, the league made a further public statement announcing the cancellation of the remaining games of the 2020 season and that they would be exploring options for playoffs once it was safe to resume play.

On June 4th, the league confirmed that the playoffs would also be cancelled due to the pandemic.

Final standings

Regular season

Cancelled games

Roster

See also
2020 NLL season

References

Calgary
Calgary Roughnecks seasons
Calgary Roughnecks